Night Owl, a 1993 vampire film shot in New York City's Alphabet City and directed by Jeffrey Arsenault, starred John Leguizamo and James Raftery as Jake, a brooding vampire/squatter who picks up women in nightclubs and while having sex with them, slices their necks with a matte knife and drinks their blood. One night he murders the sister of Angel, John Leguizamo, who begins a desperate search to find her killer. Ultimately, their paths cross and what happens is shocking. Meanwhile, Jake falls in love with Anne Guish, a performance artist, and tries desperately to resist his urge for fresh blood. Featuring Warhol superstar Holly Woodlawn, Caroline Munro of James Bond and Hammer Horror fame, and David Roya from Billy Jack, it was the first in a succession of gritty black and white bloodsucker movies set in the same area of New York City, followed by Nadja and The Addiction. Leguizamo, in one of his first roles, went on to major stardom with films like Moulin Rouge!, Carlito's Way and Land of the Dead. Raftery now writes music and performs under the name Rat Wakes Red. Retitled Nite Owl when released on DVD. Not to be confused with a film of the same name starring Jennifer Beals. Interesting note: During the two-year time span of shooting the film, Arsenault directed Leguizamo in his first one-man show, Mambo Mouth, Off-Broadway.

Cast
John Leguizamo - Angel
James Raftery - Jake
Ali Thomas - Anne
David Roya - Dario
Holly Woodlawn - Barfly
Lisa Napoli - Frances
Yul Vazquez - Tomas
Caroline Munro - Herself

External links
Night Owl at the Internet Movie Database
Night Owl at Allmovie

1993 horror films
1993 films
American black-and-white films
Squatting in film
American horror films
1990s English-language films
1990s American films